Y Felinheli, formerly known in English as Port Dinorwic, is a village and community beside the Menai Strait ( or Afon Menai) between Bangor and Caernarfon in Gwynedd, northwest Wales.

History

Toponymy
Etymologically, its name comes from the Welsh y meaning the, melin meaning mill and heli, meaning brine/salt-water/sea. An alternative interpretation is from Y Felin Heulyn, "the mill on the River Heulyn", which refers to the river that runs into the village.

Origins
Y Felinheli has its origins in two hamlets, Tafarngrisiau near St Mary's Church and Aberpwll to the north-east where there was a mill on the Afon Heulyn. The mill was rebuilt closer to the sea in 1633 and gave its name to the settlement. The area was largely agricultural until the area was transformed by slate quarrying in the 19th century. A new dock was built in 1828 when lime was extracted at Brynadda and slate and lime were loaded and culm (coal dust or anthracite slack) was brought in to fire the lime kilns.

The owners of the Vaynol Estate, the Assheton Smiths, owned most of the land in Y Felinheli and developed the Dinorwic Quarry in the late 18th century, They also built the harbour to export slate transported to the quay by the Dinorwic Railway, a narrow gauge railway that was subsequently replaced by the Padarn Railway. Industrial expansion gave Y Felinheli (Felin-hely, 1838) the alternative name Port Dinorwig or Port Dinorwic.

Harbour 
The harbour is a centre for pleasure boating and sailing. It has moorings, a marina and yacht support businesses, including rigging, sail making and boatyards. The boatyard was constructed before the Second World War for building landing craft. Its slipway, probably the largest in North Wales is in private ownership, is usable at most states of tide. The local sailing club organizes dinghy racing.

Demographics

Population

Number 
The population of the village was 2,284 at the 2011 Census. According to the 2021 Census, Y Felinheli's population was 2,330.

Density 

Languages

Welsh 
According to the United Kingdom Census 2021, 68.3 per cent of all usual residents aged 3+ in Y Felinheli can speak Welsh. 78.6 per cent of the population noted that they could speak, read, write or understand Welsh. 

The 2011 census noted 64.3 per cent of all usual residents aged 3 years and older in the village could speak Welsh. The 2011 census also noted that 89.4 per cent of all usual residents aged 3+ who were born in Wales could speak Welsh. The Welsh-language skills of Y Felinheli residents were as follows in 2011 and 2021:

As of January 2018, 82.9% of pupils aged 5 or over in the village's primary school (Ysgol Y Felinheli) spoke Welsh at home.

In 2001, 72.1% of all usual residents aged 3+ in Y Felinheli could speak Welsh. 73.4% could speak it in 1991. In 1981, 80.6 per cent of the population could speak Welsh; 3.1% of the population were monoglot Welsh-speakers.

Other languages 
According to the 2011 Census, 6% of Y Felinheli's population spoke a language other than English or Welsh as their main language. The most common was Arabic, with 2.92% speaking it as their main language.

Identity 
According to the 2011 Census, 59.7% of the population noted that they had Welsh-only national identity, with 35.6% noting that they had no Welsh national identity at all. According to the 2022 Census, 63.8% of the population noted that they had Welsh-only national identity.

Country of Birth 
The 2021 Census noted that 93.9% of the population was born in the United Kingdom. The 2011 Census noted that 91.1% of the population was born in the United Kingdom. 66.1% of the population was born in Wales and 23.8% of the population born in England. 5.7% of the population was born outside the European Union.

Ethnic Group 
In 2021, 96.5% of the population identified their ethnic group within the high-level "White" category.

Religion 
The religion question was voluntary in the 2021 Census. Of those in Y Felinheli who answered the question, 49.4% described themselves as having no religion, with 49.2% describing themselves as Christian. Buddhist was the second most common religion.

Notable people 
 Siân Gwenllian (born 1956) a Welsh Plaid Cymru politician
 Wil Jones (1960–2020) a Welsh portrait artist, guitarist, and teacher.
 Lisa Gwilym (born 1975) a Welsh broadcaster, lives in the village.

Transport
The A487 road by-pass, completed in 1994, has removed much traffic congestion from the main street. The nearest railway station as the crow flies is across the Menai Strait at Llanfairpwll. The next nearest (not involving travelling by boat) is at Bangor.

Historically, the passenger railway station Port Dinorwic was open between 1852 and 1960. There was also a narrow gauge railway running from the town to Dinorwic Quarry on the Dinorwic Railway (later Padarn Railway) to carry slate.

Education 
Welsh language parent-and-toddler group Cylch Ti a Fi Y Felinheli and a Welsh-language playgroup Cylch Meithrin Y Felinheli currently serves the community with the support of Mudiad Meithrin.

Ysgol Gynradd Y Felinheli provides Welsh-medium primary education to the village and the surrounding area. As of 2022, there were 179 pupils enrolled at the school.

In terms of secondary education, the village is in the catchment area of three secondary schools, namely Ysgol Tryfan, Ysgol Syr Hugh Owen and Ysgol Friars.

Governance

Local Government 
Y Felinheli forms part of the Bethel a'r Felinheli ward and is currently represented in Gwynedd Council by Plaid Cymru councillors Sasha Ellen Fraser Williams and Iwan Huws. The village also has a Community Council, currently chaired by councillor Iwan Huws.

Senedd 
The village is currently represented in the Senedd by Arfon constituency member Siân Gwenllian (Plaid Cymru).

It is also represented by four North Wales regional members, namely Carolyn Thomas (Labour), Llyr Huws Gruffydd (Plaid Cymru), Sam Rowlands and Mark Isherwood (Welsh Conservatives).

House of Commons 
The village is currently represented in the House of Commons by Arfon constituency member Hywel Williams (Plaid Cymru), who was previously MP for the Caernarfon constituency from 2001.

Culture 
The first National Cerdd Dant Festival was held in Y Felinheli in 1947.

The local carnival committee organises the annual Gŵyl Y Felinheli.

Sport 
The local football team, CPD Y Felinheli celebrated its 40th anniversary in 2017. For the 2021–22 season, the team was selected by the FAW to be part of the newly created Ardal Leagues North West.

A private members sailing club, Clwb Hwylio Y Felinheli, has been based in the village, on the banks of the Menai Strait, since 1947. As of 2015, it had 136 youth members who have been trained at the club.

References

Bibliography

External links 

 Community Council
 geograph photos of Y Felinheli and surrounding area
 Y Felinheli/Port Dinorwic Marina

Ports and harbours of Wales
Communities in Gwynedd
Gwynedd electoral wards
Villages in Gwynedd